Kim Staunton (born 24 March 1966) is an Australian former professional tennis player.

Staunton, a player from Sydney, was a two-time Australian Open girls' doubles champion, with Annette Gulley in 1982 and Bernadette Randall in 1983. When she won in 1983 she also earned a position in the women's singles main draw, but came up against the 13th-seeded Claudia Kohde-Kilsch in the first round and lost in straight sets.

References

External links
 
 

1966 births
Living people
Australian female tennis players
Tennis players from Sydney
Australian Open (tennis) junior champions
Grand Slam (tennis) champions in girls' doubles